Acanthodactylus robustus, also known commonly as the robust fringe-fingered lizard and the robust fringe-toed lizard, is a species of lizard in the family Lacertidae. The species is endemic to the Middle East.

Geographic range
A. robustus is found in Iraq, Jordan, Saudi Arabia, and Syria

Reproduction
A. robustus is oviparous.

References

Further reading
Leviton, Alan E.; Anderson, Steven C.; Adler, Kraig; Minton, Sherman A. (1992). Handbook to Middle East Amphibians and Reptiles. (Contributions to Herpetology No. 8). Oxford, Ohio: Society for the Study of Amphibians and Reptiles (SSAR). 252 pp. .
Salvador, Alfredo (1982). "A revision of the lizards of the genus Acanthodactylus (Sauria: Lacertidae)". Bonner Zoologische Monographien (16): 1–167. (Acanthodactylus robustus, pp. 106–109, Figures 63–65, Map 21). (in English, with an abstract in German).
Sindaco, Roberto; Jeremčenko, Valery K. (2008). The Reptiles of the Western Palearctic: 1. Annotated Checklist and Distributional Atlas of the Turtles, Crocodiles, Amphisbaenians and Lizards of Europe, North Africa, Middle East and Central Asia. (Monographs of the Societas Herpetologica Italica). Latina, Italy: Edizioni Belvedere. 580 pp. .
Werner F (1929). "Beiträge zur Kenntnis der Fauna von Syrien und Persien ". Zoologischer Anzeiger 81: 238–245. (Acanthodactylus robustus, new species, pp. 240–242, Figure 2). (in German).

Acanthodactylus
Lizards of Asia
Reptiles described in 1929
Taxa named by Franz Werner